The Henson Gletscher Formation is a geologic formation in Greenland. It preserves fossils dating back to the Cambrian period. It is named after the Henson Glacier (Greenland).

See also

 List of fossiliferous stratigraphic units in Greenland

References
 

Cambrian Greenland
Cambrian southern paleotropical deposits